Juan Beltrán de Guevara was a Roman Catholic prelate who served as Titular Archbishop of Nicaea (1573) and Bishop of Mazara del Vallo (1571–1573).

Biography
On 24 September 1571, Juan Beltrán de Guevara was appointed during the papacy of Pope Pius V as Bishop of Mazara del Vallo. On 16 January 1573, he resigned as Bishop of Mazara del Vallo and was appointed Titular Archbishop of Nicaea.

While bishop, he served as the principal co-consecrator of Gaspar de Quiroga y Vela, Bishop of Cuenca (1572).

See also 
Catholic Church in Italy

References

External links and additional sources
 (for Chronology of Bishops) 
 (for Chronology of Bishops) 

16th-century Roman Catholic bishops in Sicily
Bishops appointed by Pope Pius V